Kimberly A. Rosen (née Dumas; born ) is an American Grammy-nominated audio mastering engineer. Since 2009, she owns and runs a mastering studio in Ringwood, New Jersey.

Career 

Rosen grew up in the western Massachusetts town of Northampton. With an interest in pursuing a career in the music industry, she began an internship at West West Side Music in Tenafly, New Jersey. There, she assisted chief mastering engineer Alan Douches from 2002 through 2009. While assisting at West West Side Music, Rosen began taking on her own mastering projects and was promoted to staff mastering engineer in 2004. As a mastering engineer at West West Side Music, Rosen mastered a wide range of projects for artists such as Franz Ferdinand, Dashboard Confessional, Jeremy Enigk, and La Dispute.

In 2009, Rosen started her audio mastering studio, Knack Mastering, in Ringwood, New Jersey. Acoustician Chris Pelonis designed her mastering room.

Rosen participated in speeches on mastering and audio industry-related panels at the AES Convention, Summer NAMM, the PotLuck Audio Conference (Tucson, Arizona), and the Welcome to 1979 Recording Summit (Nashville, Tennessee).

In October 2017, Rosen and her husband Dave launched Whitestone Audio Instruments, a company that designs and produces professional analog processing equipment for audio engineers. Their first product, the P331 Tube Loading Amplifier, was unveiled at the 2018 NAMM Show in Anaheim, CA.

Rosen is an active member and was elected as a Governor of the New York Chapter of the Recording Academy (Grammys) in 2018.

Work 
Kimberly Rosen works both for independent artists and labels and major label record companies and producers. Her most notable releases include works of Bonnie Raitt, Wynonna Judd, Joe Henry, Superdrag, Jeff Bridges, Amy Helm, and Title Fight.

In 2014, she worked on the remake of the Johnny Cash album Bitter Tears, published by Sony Masterworks, with the participation of Emmylou Harris, Steve Earl, Gillian Welch, The Milk Carton Kids and Kris Kristofferson. In 2015, she mastered the rearrangement of "Forever Young", theme of the television series Parenthood, performed by Rhiannon Giddens and Iron & Wine for its season finale.

Rosen was nominated for Best Engineered album (non-classical) for Bonnie Raitt's Dig In Deep (2016) and Milk Carton Kids' All the Things That I Did and All the Things That I Didn't Do (2018).

Several albums mastered by Kimberly Rosen received a Grammy Award nomination. Aimee Mann's Mental Illness (2017) won the Best Folk Album Grammy; Bettye LaVette's Worthy (2015) was Grammy-nominated for Best Blues Album, while Victor Wainwright's Victor Wainwright and The Train (2018) and Teresa James & the Rhythm Tramps' Here In Babylon (2018) were nominated for Best Contemporary Blues Albums.

Grammy nominations and awards

Selected discography

References

Year of birth uncertain
Place of birth missing (living people)
Living people
Mastering engineers
American audio engineers
Women audio engineers
People from Northampton, Massachusetts
People from Ringwood, New Jersey
1980s births